Priasilphidae is a family of beetles in the superfamily Cucujoidea. They have a Gondwanan distribution, with the three known genera Chileosilpha, Priasilpha and Priastichus being native to Chile, New Zealand and Tasmania respectively. Most species are flightless, lacking wings. Priasilphids inhabit decaying wood and moss in forest habitats. They are likely mycophagous, feeding on fungi.

Genera
These three genera belong to the family Priasilphidae:
 Chileosilpha Leschen, Lawrence & Ślipiński, 2005
 Priasilpha Broun, 1894
 Priastichus Crowson, 1973

References

Further reading

 
 
 

Cucujoidea
Cucujoidea families